Mark Holt (born 6 November 1985) is a New Zealand former football player and coach.

Coach 
Mark Holt began his coaching career as a youngster working for former New Zealand Under 17 coach Steve Cain. To gain experience, he worked as an assistant for FIFA Technical Director and New Zealand 1982 World Cup coach Kevin Fallon at Mount Albert Grammar School and Auckland club Eastern Suburbs AFC.

In 2013, Holt left Mount Albert Grammar to take over the One Tree Hill College Football Academy. During his 4 seasons at the school the First XI made history winning back to back promotions. 

In 2014, Holt became coach of Eastern Suburbs AFC. Holt's 2014 Eastern Suburbs side were promoted to the NRFL Premier League, with Holt winning the NRFL Coach of the Year award.

After the successful campaign with Eastern Suburbs, Holt was offered the Waitakere United National Youth League coaching position. They finished 2nd in the 2014 and 2015 season.

In November 2014, Holt left Eastern Suburbs AFC to take over the vacant Papatoetoe AFC position.  He spent 2 seasons at the club before moving to America to take up an offer of Assistant Coach at Purdue Fort Wayne University.

In 2020, Holt returned to New Zealand to take over as Head Coach of Franklin United. The club had a home and away playoff that year against Te Atatu AFC, which secured promotion to NRFL Div 2.

References

Living people
1985 births